The following is a list of notable events and releases that happened in 2003 in music in South Korea.

Debuting and disbanded in 2003

Debuted groups and sub-units

Big Mama
Brown Eyed Soul
Buzz
Dynamic Duo
Epik High
The RockTigers
S
Stony Skunk
Take
TVXQ

Solo debuts

Bada
Big Mama King
Koo Jun-yup
Eugene
Gummy
Jeon Hye-bin
KCM
Lee Hyori
Lee Jung
Lee Min-woo
Lexy
Masta Wu
Seven
Tim
U;Nee
Park Yong-ha

Disbanded groups
CB Mass
jtL
Luv
M.I.L.K.
Shinvi

Releases in 2003

January

February

March

April

May

June

July

August

September

October

November

December

See also
2003 in South Korea
List of South Korean films of 2003

References

 
South Korean music
K-pop